The New Jersey Athletic Conference men's basketball tournament is the annual conference basketball championship tournament for the NCAA Division III New Jersey Athletic Conference. The tournament has been held annually since 2003. It is a single-elimination tournament and seeding is based on regular season records.

The winner, declared conference champion, receives the NJAC's automatic bid to the NCAA Men's Division III Basketball Championship.

Results

Championship records

 Kean and Rutgers–Camden have not yet qualified for the NJAC tournament finals

References

NCAA Division III men's basketball conference tournaments
Basketball Tournament, Men's
Recurring sporting events established in 2003